Mac Divot was an American syndicated comic strip written by Jordan Lanski and drawn by Mel Keefer, and distributed by Chicago Tribune Syndicate.

History 

The strip was originally called Links Driver, and debuted in Chicago Tribune  on 18 April 1955. It features the realistic sport adventures of golf champion Sandy Mac Divot, which was modelled over golfer Gene Littler, who had been a Lanski's real life friend and schoolmate.

It ended in 1975, when Lanski left the comics industry to work in advertising. The strip has been published internationally in over 100 newspapers, including in Europe, Japan and Australia.

While golf seldom appeared in previous comic strips, Mac Divot is regarded as the first comic strip having golf as main theme.

References

1955 comics debuts
1975 comics endings
American comic strips
Sports comics
Comic strips syndicated by Tribune Content Agency